Every Direction Is North is the second full-length studio album from Los Angeles-based post-rock duo El Ten Eleven.

Since its release, it has received multiple favorable reviews.

Track listing
"3 Plus 4" – 4:12
"Every Direction Is North" – 5:12
"Hot Cakes" – 2:42
"Estrella" – 3:39
"Music for Staring at Ceilings" – 2:35
"Keep" – 4:02
"Dax Pierson" – 3:02
"Living on Credit Blues" – 4:12
"The 49th Day" – 4:53
"Bye Annie, Bye Joe, Bye Michael, Bye Jake" – 7:24

References

2007 albums
Bar/None Records albums
El Ten Eleven albums